Alican Karadağ (born 8 January 1990) is a Turkish professional footballer who plays as a midfielder.

Professional career
Karadağ spent most of his playing career in the TFF First League and TFF Second League, playing over 120 games in the lower divisions of Turkey. On 8 January 2018, he signed with Kardemir Karabükspor after a successful half season at Kastamonuspor where he scored 5 goals in 12 games. Karadağ made his professional debut with Kardemir Karabükspor in a 3-2 Süper Lig loss to Kayserispor on 11 March 2018.

References

External links
 
 
 
 Kardemir Karabukspor Profile

1990 births
People from Altındağ, Ankara
Living people
Turkish footballers
Association football midfielders
Gençlerbirliği S.K. footballers
Ankaraspor footballers
1461 Trabzon footballers
Ankara Keçiörengücü S.K. footballers
Sivasspor footballers
Fethiyespor footballers
Boluspor footballers
Giresunspor footballers
Şanlıurfaspor footballers
Adana Demirspor footballers
Kastamonuspor footballers
Kardemir Karabükspor footballers
Kahramanmaraşspor footballers
Süper Lig players
TFF First League players
TFF Second League players